Lemnia saucia is a species of ladybird in the family Coccinellidae.

Lemnia saucia is endemic to Asia and can be found in India, Japan and the Philippines. It has also been collected in the Indochinese peninsula. It was introduced to Taiwan in order to control aphids (Aphidoidea) which feed on the country's sugar cane crops.

It was first described by French entomologist, Étienne Mulsant, in 1850 from the collections of Frederick William Hope and John O. Westwood in the British Museum of Natural History.

References

Insects of Taiwan
Coccinellidae
Beetles described in 1850